This is a list of cricketers who played for Suffolk cricket teams in first-class cricket matches. Suffolk teams played four matches which have been classified as first-class cricket during the 19th century. A total of 26 men played in the four matches for Suffolk, with just one, Fuller Pilch, playing in all four.

All four of the matches which Suffolk played and which are considered first-class were played against MCC. The first pair of matches took place in 1830, the first in June at Lord's, followed by a re-match at Field Lane at Bury St Edmunds. These were followed by a second pair of first-class matches at the same venues in 1847. Suffolk sides had first played MCC in 1827 and matches had been played against Norfolk sides in 1829. Matches continued to be played against MCC throughout most of the 19th century, but other than the matches in 1830 and 1847 none of these matches have been awarded first-class status. Matches were also played against other teams with first-class status, including the All England Eleven and Cambridge Town Club, and from the 1870s against Essex County Cricket Club.

A formal Suffolk County Cricket Club was established in 1864 and played in the Minor Counties Championship from 1904 until 1914. The club was reformed in 1932 and rejoined the Minor Counties Championship in 1934. The club played List A cricket in domestic competitions between 1966 and 2005. Players who played in these matches are listed separately.

A

B

C

D

G

K

L

M

P

Q

S

W

Notes

Sources

Bibliography
 Carlaw D (2020) Kent County Cricketers A to Z. Part One: 1806–1914 (revised edition). (Available online at the Association of Cricket Statisticians and Historians. Retrieved 2020-12-21.)

References

Suffolk
Suffolk first-class cricketers